Zevenmorgen is a hamlet in the Dutch province of Gelderland. It is a part of the municipality of Buren, and lies about 8 km south of Veenendaal.

Zevenmorgen is not a statistical entity, and the postal authorities have placed it under Ingen. It was first mentioned in 1884 as Zevenmorgen, and means seven morgen (old land measurement unit).

References

Populated places in Gelderland
Buren